Thörishaus railway station could refer to two stations in Köniz, Switzerland:

 Thörishaus Dorf railway station
 Thörishaus Station railway station